Belsy Laza Muñoz  (born 5 June 1967 in Guantánamo) is a retired Cuban shot putter. Her personal best put was 20.96 metres, achieved in May 1992 in Mexico City. This is the current North America, Central America and the Caribbean (NACAC) record.

Achievements

References

1967 births
Living people
Cuban female shot putters
Athletes (track and field) at the 1987 Pan American Games
Athletes (track and field) at the 1991 Pan American Games
Athletes (track and field) at the 1995 Pan American Games
Athletes (track and field) at the 1999 Pan American Games
Athletes (track and field) at the 1992 Summer Olympics
Athletes (track and field) at the 1996 Summer Olympics
Olympic athletes of Cuba
Sportspeople from Guantánamo
Pan American Games medalists in athletics (track and field)
Pan American Games gold medalists for Cuba
Pan American Games bronze medalists for Cuba
Universiade medalists in athletics (track and field)
Goodwill Games medalists in athletics
Central American and Caribbean Games gold medalists for Cuba
Competitors at the 1990 Central American and Caribbean Games
Universiade silver medalists for Cuba
Central American and Caribbean Games medalists in athletics
Medalists at the 1989 Summer Universiade
Medalists at the 1993 Summer Universiade
Competitors at the 1990 Goodwill Games
Competitors at the 1994 Goodwill Games
Medalists at the 1991 Pan American Games